Niko Peltola (born June 1, 1990) is a Finnish former professional ice hockey defenceman who played for Ilves, Jokerit, Vaasan Sport and Ässät in the Liiga.

References

External links 
 

1990 births
Living people
Ässät players
Finnish ice hockey defencemen
Ilves players
Jokerit players
Kiekko-Vantaa players
Sportspeople from Huittinen
Vaasan Sport players